Flagstaff Hill usually refers to a hill on which a flag was erected. It may refer to:

Place names

Australia
 Flagstaff Hill, near Linton, Victoria
 Flagstaff Hill, Melbourne, a hill in the historic Flagstaff Gardens, Melbourne
 Flagstaff Hill, South Australia, a suburb in Adelaide, Australia

China
 Flagstaff Hill, Tai Po, a hill in Tai Po, New Territories, Hong Kong

Malaysia
 Flagstaff Hill, one of the hills in the Penang Hill group of peaks, and a former name of the group

New Zealand
 Flagstaff Hill, New Zealand, a hill in Russell, Bay of Island, which played a role in the Flagstaff War of 1845
 Flagstaff, Otago, sometimes called Flagstaff Hill, is a prominent hill overlooking the northwest of the city of Dunedin, in New Zealand's South Island
 Observation Point, sometimes called Flagstaff Hill, is a prominent bluff in Port Chalmers, also in the South Island

Saint Martin
 A hill on the French side of the Franco-Dutch island of Saint Martin.

United States
 Flagstaff Hill, Alaska, a hill on Unga Island, Alaska
 Flagstaff Hill in Hill County, Montana
 Flagstaff Hill in Sheridan County, Montana
 Flagstaff Hill, Pennsylvania, an outdoor space in Schenley Park, Pittsburgh, Pennsylvania

See also
Flagstaff hill incident, a 1976 cross-border incident between Ireland and the United Kingdom